Leonard St Clair Morgan (19 September 1879 – 5 July 1947) was an Australian rules footballer who played for Collingwood in the Victorian Football League (VFL) at the turn of the 20th century.

References

External links

1879 births
1947 deaths
Australian rules footballers from Victoria (Australia)
Australian Rules footballers: place kick exponents
Collingwood Football Club players
Ballarat Imperial Football Club players
People from Hamilton, Victoria